A military raid is a mission where the main objective is to demoralize, destroy valuable enemy installations, free prisoners, gather intelligence, or capture or kill specific personnel. This contrasts to regular military operations where the end goal is to capture territory and advance. Raids are a quick attack, relying heavily on the element of surprise to achieve their objective. After the success or failure of the mission, the raiding force will attempt to retreat to friendly territory before the enemy is able to co-ordinate a counterattack.

Raids are favored by guerrilla, irregular, or special forces. Due to the disproportional affect that a raid can have on an enemy, relative to the attacker's strength and the duration of the attack, raids are a favored tactic in irregular warfare.

This article contains a list of military raids, not including air raids, sorted by the date at which they started:

raids